is a Prefectural Natural Park in Wakayama Prefecture, Japan. Established in 2009, the park is wholly located within the city of Tanabe.

See also
 National Parks of Japan
 List of Places of Scenic Beauty of Japan (Wakayama)

References

External links
  Map of Hatenashi Sanmyaku Prefectural Natural Park

Parks and gardens in Wakayama Prefecture
Tanabe, Wakayama
Protected areas established in 2009
2009 establishments in Japan